Henry Alexander Wise (August 21, 1906 – December 13, 1982) was an American lawyer and politician from New York.

Life
He was born on August 21, 1906, in Watertown, Jefferson County, New York, the son of Jennings Cropper Wise (1881–1968) and Elizabeth Lydecker (Anderson) Wise (1883–1963). He graduated from Virginia Military Institute with the Class of 1927, and in 1931 from the University of Virginia. In April 1935, he married Deborah Halsey Turnbull (1909–1943). In 1941, he married Mary Alice Buck (1918–1981), and they had three children. During World War II he served in the U.S. Army. He practiced law in Watertown.

Political career 

Wise was a member of the New York State Senate from 1948 to 1964, sitting in the 166th, 167th, 168th, 169th, 170th, 171st, 172nd, 173rd and 174th New York State Legislatures. He was a delegate to the 1952 Republican National Convention. In June 1964, he ran in the Republican primary for Congress in the 31st District, but was defeated by Robert C. McEwen.

Return to Lexington and final years 

Shortly after moving to live in Lexington, Virginia in 1966, Wise was elected historian of the VMI Alumni Association. This led to an initial research project on the Association itself, which gradually expanded into researching the entire history of the Virginia Military Institute. The result, Drawing Out the Man: The VMI Story, was published through the University of Virginia Press in 1978, with the foreword written by Harry F. Byrd, Jr., who attended VMI from 1931 to 1933 before transferring to the University of Virginia.

He died on December 13, 1982; and was buried at the Wise family cemetery in Accomack County, Virginia.

Personal life 
Congressman from Virginia John Sergeant Wise (1846–1913) was his grandfather; and Governor of Virginia Henry A. Wise (1806–1876) and Congressman from New York Joseph H. Anderson (1800–1870) were his great-grandfathers.

References

External links
 
 Genealogical Record and Chart of the Family of Elizabeth Lydecker Anderson compiled by Jennings Cropper Wise (1916)

1906 births
1982 deaths
Republican Party New York (state) state senators
Politicians from Watertown, New York
Virginia Military Institute alumni
University of Virginia alumni
20th-century American politicians
Wise family of Virginia